Dasiosoma testaceum is a species of brown coloured ground beetle in the Lebiinae subfamily that is endemic to Zimbabwe.

References

Beetles described in 1937
Beetles of Africa
Endemic fauna of Zimbabwe